La-related protein 6 also known as acheron or La ribonucleoprotein domain family member 6 (LARP6), is a protein that in humans is encoded by the LARP6 gene.

Clinical relevance
In a recent genome-wide association study, LARP6 gene has been associated with fasting glucose traits, type 2 diabetes and obesity.

References

Further reading